The 15th Pan American Games were held in Rio de Janeiro, Brazil from 13 July 2007 to 29 July 2007.

Medal summary

Medal table

|  style="text-align:left; width:78%; vertical-align:top;"|

|  style="text-align:left; width:22%; vertical-align:top;"|

Athletics

Guyana qualified four track and field athletes (one men and three women).

Key
Note–Ranks given for track events are for the entire round
Q = Qualified for the next round
NR = National record
GR = Games record
DNF = Did not finish
DNS = Did not start
NM = No mark

Track
Men

Women

Field events
Women

Boxing

Guyana participated with a team of 2 athletes.

Men

Diving
Megan Farrow qualified to women's 3 m springboard event, but she didn't participate it.

Taekwondo

Guyana participated with a team of 2 athletes.

Men

See also
Guyana at the 2008 Summer Olympics

References

External links
Rio 2007 Official website

Nations at the 2007 Pan American Games
P
2007